"The Toys of Caliban" is the twenty-ninth episode and the fifth episode of the second season (1986–87) of the television series The Twilight Zone. In this episode, two older parents struggle to care for their mentally challenged son as his psychic powers become increasingly powerful and deadly. The title is a reference to the character Caliban from the William Shakespeare play The Tempest.

Plot
Ernest and Mary Ross, are an older couple with a son, Toby, a teen with a mental impairment and the ability to teleport things he has seen by just saying the word "bring". Ernest and Mary have lived as recluses for many years so as not to expose Toby to dangerous images or things that he might summon. When Toby "brings" a living organism, whatever it is arrives dead.

Toby pleads with his parents for doughnuts. After they give their permission, Ernest unlocks a drawer containing pictures of doughnuts, but Toby materializes the doughnuts before Ernest can show him the pictures. Ernest recognizes that Toby's power is growing stronger.

That night, Toby becomes seriously ill. Ernest suspects that since Toby no longer needs to see pictures he may have summoned more doughnuts and made himself sick on them. Though Mary is terrified of the dangers of bringing Toby to a public place, Ernest realizes they have no choice but to take their son to a hospital. Ernest and Mary spend the night at the hospital and take Toby home the next day. Their guarded, reclusive behavior attracts the attention of a social worker, Miss Kemp, particularly after they refuse to let Toby see a magazine she offers to him.

At home Toby summons the magazine and eagerly looks through it. Seeing a diagram of a heart, he "brings" the nearest one, which happens to belong to Mary. She instantly collapses, dead. Following Mary's funeral, Kemp interviews the Ross family neighbors, learning how they never let Toby venture outside or play with others. She begins to build a case to remove Toby, unless Ernest enrolls his son in a school for the mentally impaired. Cornered, Ernest explains the situation to Kemp, having Toby demonstrate his power by summoning real items from images in a picture book. Kemp believes Toby needs professional help. Ernest insists that if psychologists and scientists discover just what his son can do, Toby will be both feared and exploited for his unique power. Kemp refuses to remain quiet, but suddenly leaves in horror when Toby, seeing Mary's photograph, wants his mother and summons her corpse to an armchair.

While burying Mary's body in the backyard, Ernest hears a distant police siren. He tells her that it is finally time. Ernest then sits with his son, tells him he loves him, and presents him with a picture of a sunset. Toby "brings" what he sees, incinerating them both instantly, destroying the Ross home as the police arrive.

External links
 

The Twilight Zone (1985 TV series season 2) episodes
1986 American television episodes
Fictional psychics
Television episodes written by George R. R. Martin
Fictional telekinetics
Television episodes about psychic powers

fr:Le Don de l'enfer